James Trick Jose (1881 – 1963) was a Cornish rugby union player born in Falmouth who played for both Falmouth RFC and Devonport Albion (now Plymouth Albion). Jose gained 20 caps for Cornwall between 1904-11 and was a member of the famous 1908 County Championship winning side who beat Durham 17-3 at Redruth.

Also on 26 October 1908 playing for Cornwall who were representing Great Britain he competed in the 1908 Summer Olympics at White City Stadium, London losing to Australia in the final.

References

External links
J. T. Jose's profile at Sports Reference.com

See also

Cornish rugby

1881 births
1963 deaths
Cornish rugby union players
English shipwrights
Olympic rugby union players of Great Britain
Olympic silver medallists for Great Britain
Plymouth Albion R.F.C. players
Rugby union players at the 1908 Summer Olympics
Medalists at the 1908 Summer Olympics